Sahila Chadha (Chaddha is an alternative spelling for the surname Chadha) is an Indian former actress.

Personal life
Sahila is married to actor Nimai Bali, with whom she has a daughter.

Career
Sahila was crowned Miss India and won 25 contests before becoming a Miss India. She played the character of Rita in the film Hum Aapke Hain Koun and has featured alongside many superstars, including Shahrukh Khan, Salman Khan, Govinda, and Sanjay Dutt.

Filmography

References

External links

Actresses from Mumbai
Living people
Actresses in Hindi cinema
Indian beauty pageant winners
Indian film actresses
20th-century Indian actresses
21st-century Indian actresses
Female models from Mumbai
Year of birth missing (living people)